Suess Land is a peninsula in King Christian X Land, East Greenland. Administratively it is part of the Northeast Greenland National Park.

History 
This peninsula was named by A.G. Nathorst after Austrian geologist Eduard Suess (1831–1914) at the time of his 1899 venture searching for traces of the lost Andrée expedition. Nathorst had previously translated a book by Eduard Suess into Swedish.

Geography
Suess Land has a mountainous, Alpine terrain. It is located west of Ymer Island, south of Andree Land, north of Lyell Land and northeast of Gletscherland.

It is bounded in the west by Kjerulf Fjord, in the north by Kaiser Franz Joseph Fjord, in the northeast by the Antarctic Sound, in the east by the King Oscar Fjord, in the south by the Kempe Fjord and the Dickson Fjord. The peninsula is attached to Goodenough Land by a narrow isthmus in the southwest.

There are several glaciers in the peninsula, including the Fulach Glacier, the Sonklar Glacier and the Hisinger Glacier that has its terminus at the southwestern end.

References

Peninsulas of Greenland